Plasmodium elongatum is a malaria parasite discovered by Hartman and first disclosed in Hartman 1927. Study of it has been fundamental to understanding the lifecycle of malaria along with study of P. gallinaceum, also a malaria parasite of birds. It is the type species of the subgenus Huffia.

References

Plasmodium